Aghyaran St Davog's is a GAA club. It is based in the hamlet of Aghyaran near Castlederg, County Tyrone, Northern Ireland.

History
Aghyaran St Davog's was founded in 1956. There was a previous club in the area between 1947 and 1948. A ladies' football club was established in 1993.

Honours
 Tyrone Intermediate Football Championship 
 1981, 1987
 Tyrone Senior Football League (1)
 2000
 Tyrone Junior Football League (1) 
 1962

Notable players
Ciaran McGarvey played full back on team that lost to Kerry in the 1986 All-Ireland final, marking star forward Eoin Liston. Shane Sweeney was the first player from Aghyaran to win a Senior County All-Ireland medal in 2005, along with former Aghyaran player Martin Penrose. Aghyaran currently have two players on the Tyrone team, Benny Gallen, Ronan McNamee and Ronan McHugh. Ronan McNamee played fullback on the team that won the 2016 Ulster Senior Football Championship.

Brendan Dolan (R.I.P) was the first Aghyaran man to represent Tyrone at senior level. Brendan made his Tyrone Championship debut in 1970, and was ever present at midfield for Tyrone and Ulster Railway Cup squads, and got to show off his high fielding skills as Tyrone toured America '69. Brendan stood at 6 ft 4 inches tall, he won MacRory and Hogan Cup medals with St Columb's Derry in 1965 and was a member of the Tyrone Junior Team that won an All Ireland in 1968. Sadly his life was cut short after a tragic car accident that took his life, whilst he was driving to school in Strabane where he worked as a PE teacher, in January 1973.

Gaelic games clubs in County Tyrone
Gaelic football clubs in County Tyrone